Some sites of interest in Sarajevo include:

Cultural sites of interest

Historical Museum of Bosnia and Herzegovina
Museum of Sarajevo 1878–1918
National and University Library of Bosnia and Herzegovina
National Gallery of Bosnia and Herzegovina
National Museum of Bosnia and Herzegovina
National Theatre
Sarajevo Tunnel
War Childhood Museum

Historical sites of interest

Baščaršija
Bezistan
Despić House
Gazi Husrev-beg Library
Hotel Europe
Marijin Dvor
Morića Han
Presidency Building
Sarajevo Clock Tower
Sebilj
Svrzo's House
Vijećnica
White Fortress

Bridges

Čobanija Bridge
Ćumurija Bridge
Drvenija Bridge
Festina lente
Goat's Bridge
Latin Bridge
Roman bridge
Skenderija Bridge
Šeher-Ćehaja Bridge

Modern sites of interest

ARIA Centar
Avaz Twist Tower
Bosmal City Center
Koševo Olympic Stadium
Sarajevo cable car
Skenderija
UNITIC World Trade Towers
Zetra Olympic Hall

Natural sites of interest
Bjelašnica
Igman
Jahorina
Trebević
Miljacka river
Vrelo Bosne

Religious sites of interest

Islam

Ali Pasha's Mosque
Čobanija Mosque
Emperor's Mosque
Ferhadija Mosque
Gazi Husrev-beg Mosque
Hadžijska Mosque
King Fahd Mosque
Muslihudin Čekrekčija Mosque

Orthodox Christianity
Cathedral of the Nativity of the Theotokos
Church of the Holy Transfiguration
Old Orthodox Church

Catholic Christianity
Church of Saint Anthony of Padua
Sacred Heart Cathedral
Saint Joseph's Church

Judaism
Sarajevo Synagogue

Historical cemeteries
Alifakovac Cemetery
Bare Cemetery
Kovači Cemetery
Koševo Cemetery
Lav Cemetery
Old Jewish Cemetery

External links
visitsarajevo.ba
Sarajevo Tourist information

Lists of tourist attractions in Bosnia and Herzegovina
Sites of interest
Sites of interest